Slalom is an alpine skiing and alpine snowboarding discipline, involving skiing between poles or gates. These are spaced more closely than those in giant slalom, super giant slalom and downhill, necessitating quicker and shorter turns.  Internationally, the sport is contested at the FIS Alpine World Ski Championships, and at the Olympic Winter Games.

History 

The term slalom comes from the Morgedal/Seljord dialect of Norwegian word "slalåm": "sla", meaning "slightly inclining hillside", and "låm", meaning "track after skis". The inventors of modern skiing classified their trails according to their difficulty. Slalåm was a trail used in Telemark by boys and girls not yet able to try themselves on the more challenging runs. Uvyrdslåm was a trail with several obstacles. A Norwegian military downhill competition in 1767 included racing downhill among trees "without falling or breaking skis". Sondre Norheim and other skiers from Telemark practiced uvyrdslåm or "disrespectful/reckless downhill" where they raced downhill in difficult and untested terrain (i.e., off piste). The 1866 "ski race" in Oslo was a combined cross-country, jumping and slalom competition. In the slalom participants were allowed use poles for braking and steering, and they were given points for style (appropriate skier posture). During the late 1800s Norwegian skiers participated in all branches (jumping, slalom, and cross-country) often with the same pair of skis. Slalom and variants of slalom were often referred to as hill races. Around 1900 hill races were abandoned in the Oslo championships at Huseby and Holmenkollen. Mathias Zdarsky's development of the Lilienfeld binding helped change hill races into a specialty of the Alps region.

The rules for the modern slalom were developed by Arnold Lunn in 1922 for the British National Ski Championships, and adopted for alpine skiing at the 1936 Winter Olympics. Under these rules gates were marked by pairs of flags rather than single ones, were arranged so that the racers had to use a variety of turn lengths to negotiate them, and scoring was on the basis of time alone, rather than on both time and style.

Course

A course is constructed by laying out a series of gates, formed by alternating pairs of red and blue poles. The skier must pass between the two poles forming the gate, with the tips of both skis and the skier's feet passing between the poles. A course has 55 to 75 gates for men and 40 to 60 for women. The gates are arranged in a variety of configurations to challenge the competitor.

Because the offsets are relatively small in slalom, ski racers take a fairly direct line and often knock the poles out of the way as they pass, which is known as blocking.  (The main blocking technique in modern slalom is cross-blocking, in which the skier takes such a tight line and angulates so strongly that he or she is able to block the gate with the outside hand.) Racers employ a variety of protective equipment, including shin pads, hand guards, helmets and face guards.

Clearing the gates
Traditionally, bamboo poles were used for gates, the rigidity of which forced skiers to maneuver their entire body around each gate. In the early 1980s, rigid poles were replaced by hard plastic poles, hinged at the base.  The hinged gates require, according to FIS rules, only that the skis and boots of the skier go around each gate.

The new gates allow a more direct path down a slalom course through the process of cross-blocking or shinning the gates. Cross-blocking is a technique in which the legs go around the gate with the upper body inclined toward, or even across, the gate; in this case the racer's outside pole and shinguards hit the gate, knocking it down and out of the way. Cross-blocking is done by pushing the gate down with the arms, hands, or shins. By 1989, most of the top technical skiers in the world had adopted the cross-block technique.

Equipment 

With the innovation of shaped skis around the turn of the 21st century, equipment used for slalom in international competition changed drastically.

The downside of the shorter skis was that athletes found that recoveries were more difficult with a smaller platform underfoot. Out of concern for the safety of athletes, the FIS began to set minimum ski lengths for international slalom competition.
 
The equipment minimums and maximums imposed by the International Ski Federation (FIS) have created a backlash from skiers, suppliers, and fans. The main objection is that the federation is regressing the equipment, and hence the sport, by two decades. 
 
American Bode Miller hastened the shift to the shorter, more radical sidecut skis when he achieved unexpected success after becoming the first Junior Olympic athlete to adopt the equipment in giant slalom and super-G in 1996. A few years later, the technology was adapted to slalom skis as well.

Men's Slalom World Cup podiums
In the following table men's slalom World Cup podiums in the World Cup since first season in 1967.

References

External links

Alpine skiing
Norwegian words and phrases

cs:Alpské lyžování#Slalom
fi:Pujottelu